Lethrinus lentjan is a species of emperor fish. It has a distinctive blood-red colouration around the margin of the gill covers. It is widespread around the Indo-West Pacific, and is reef-associated. This species is fished commercially and for sport.

Common names
Lethrinus lentjan has numerous common names, including:

pig-face bream
pink ear emperor
pink-eared emperor
purple-eared emperor
purple-headed emperor
red spot emperor
redspot emperor

Description
This is a large species, growing to approximately 50 cm in length. however specimens in the intertidal zone may be around 15 cm. The body is olive-green, becoming paler toward the belly.

The scales are large and in a diamond pattern. There is a blood-red colouration around the margin of gill covers, and often at the base of the pectoral fins as well. The dorsal fin is white has a reddish margin. Both the caudal and dorsal fins have orange mottling. The pectoral fin may be pale orange, whitish or yellowish. It has thick, fleshy lips, and a somewhat protractiile snout.

Distribution
Lethrinus lentjan is widespread in the Indo-West Pacific and other waters. It is known to live in the Red Sea and Persian Gulf, in Australia on the Great Barrier Reef, and the northern half of Australia., in the lagoon around New Caledonia, along the east coast of Africa, and in the waters of Taiwan.

Habitat
This species lives mainly in coastal areas. It occurs in coral reefs and also inhabits areas with sandy bottoms and grassy seabeds, in mangrove swamps, and deep lagoons. Juveniles are more commonly associated with shallow areas, often in loose aggregations with adult specimens. Adults are usually solitary and may be found in waters up to 84 metres in depth.

Diet
Lethrinus lentjan is a carnivore and eats mostly crustaceans and mollusks such as snails. It also feeds on echinoderms, polychaetes, bivalves, worms, and various fishes.

Human uses
This species is commercially and recreationally fished for human consumption.

Parasites
As with most fish, Lethrinus lentjan is the host of several species of parasites. 
Monogeneans parasitic on the gills include the diplectanid Calydiscoides difficilis and Calydiscoides duplicostatus, and an ancyrocephalid.
The gills also harbour unidentified gnathiid isopod larvae.
The digestive tract harbours several species of digeneans, including the opecoelid Orthodena tropica and unidentified anisakid nematode larvae.
In New Caledonia, where its parasites were studied, Lethrinus lentjan has a total of seven species of parasites.

References

External links
 

Lethrinidae
Fish of the Indian Ocean
Fish of the Pacific Ocean
Fish described in 1802
Taxa named by Bernard Germain de Lacépède